Zagrebačka pivovara (lit. Zagreb Brewery) was founded in 1892, when brewers from the Upper Town of Zagreb, Croatia realized they were not able to produce enough beer for the ever-growing and developing city. It was the first industrial brewery in Croatia. Today, it is the largest beer manufacturer in Croatia, holding 44% of the market in 2017.

History
The founding assembly of Zagrebačka pivovara as a joint-stock company was held on May 19, 1892, in the premises of the Croatian Eskompt Bank at the Ban Jelačić Square. The main initiators of the construction of a new facility were count Gustav Pongratz and baron Petar Dragan Turković. Shortly after the convention, construction in Gornja Ilica began under supervision of Janko Grahor, based on plans made by architect Kuno Waidmann.

The opening ceremony was held on July 12, 1893. This special event attracted thousands of citizens eager to see the new premises. The brewery was equipped with the Habermann cooling system, a 110 volts dynamo machine, two boilers with volume of 64 cubic litres and was illuminated by electrical lights fifteen years before it was introduced in the rest of the city. With good lighting and a big roof, the brewery quickly became one of Zagreb's most notable sights, and a place where citizens felt comfortable.

Due to its 120-year-old tradition of committing to production of good-quality beer, Zagrebačka pivovara has earned the title of the largest brewery in Croatia. Its commitment to beer has been affirmed by its business achievements and its position as the leading brewery in Croatia.

Since June 2012, Zagrebačka pivovara has been a part of the Molson Coors group within the Molson Coors Europe business unit.

Products
In 1893, Zagrebačka pivovara began producing the today’s best-selling beer in Croatia, Ožujsko pivo.

Today, it produces a variety of beer brands:
 Ožujsko pivo
 Ožujsko Rezano 
 Ožujsko Cool - non-alcoholic beer 
 Ožujsko lemon and Ožujsko grapefruit - refreshing flavoured beermix
 Tomislav - dark royal beer
 Božićno pivo - special winter beer with an artistic spirit 
 Nikšićko pivo
 Beck’s - the legendary German premium beer 
 Stella Artois - noble premium beer 
 Staropramen & Staropramen Selection - exceptional Czech beer
 Carling - leading British beer
 Corona
 Leffe and Hoegaarden - special Belgian beers 
 Löwenbräu - German beer
 Branik - Czech beer

References

Further reading
 https://www.zse.hr/userdocsimages/prospekti/ZAPI-prospekt.pdf

External links
 Zagrebačka pivovara homepage (Croatian language)

Beer in Croatia
Manufacturing companies based in Zagreb
Food and drink companies established in 1892
1892 establishments in Croatia
Molson Coors Beverage Company
Drink companies of Croatia